Daniel John Willard Ferry (born October 17, 1966) is an American former professional basketball player in the National Basketball Association (NBA) and an All-American college player at Duke University. He most recently served as interim general manager of the New Orleans Pelicans.

Considered one of the most celebrated basketball players in the United States from the high school graduating class of 1985, Ferry chose to attend Duke University. Ferry led the Duke Blue Devils to three Final Four appearances while setting many school records and earning several national player of the year awards. In 2002, Ferry was named to the Atlantic Coast Conference (ACC) 50th Anniversary men's basketball team honoring the fifty greatest players in conference history.

Drafted into the NBA in 1989 as the second overall pick, Ferry played one season for Italian league's Il Messaggero (now Virtus Roma) after refusing to play for the Los Angeles Clippers. He went on to spend the majority of his career with the Cleveland Cavaliers, where he played from 1990 to 2000. Ferry finished his playing career with the San Antonio Spurs, winning an NBA championship in the 2002–03 season.

After Ferry's playing career ended, he became an executive. Ferry has served as Vice President of Basketball Operations for the San Antonio Spurs and as General Manager of the Atlanta Hawks and the Cleveland Cavaliers.

Early life and family
Ferry was born in Hyattsville, Maryland to former NBA center and NBA executive Bob Ferry and his wife, Rita Ferry. Ferry is of Irish descent; his great-great-grandfather, Peter Ferry, was born in Ireland in 1828 and emigrated to St. Louis, Missouri. The younger Ferry began his basketball career in earnest at DeMatha Catholic High School in Maryland where he excelled at the high school level under Morgan Wootten.  The two-time All-American was ranked as one of the country's top high school basketball centers while at DeMatha and earned Parade Magazine's prep Player of the Year in 1985.  Ferry was one of the most highly recruited high school seniors in the nation before committing to Duke University.

Ferry and his wife, Tiffany, have five children.

College career

Ferry attended Duke University and played basketball for the school over four seasons from 1985 to 1989.  During his college career, he helped lead the Blue Devils to the Final Four in 1986, 1988 and 1989, twice winning the MVP award for the East Regional.  Known for his outside shooting, rebounding abilities, and full-court vision, Ferry was selected to the first team All-America in 1989 and second-team All-America in 1988.  Ferry still holds Duke's all-time single game scoring record, scoring 58 points against Miami on December 10, 1988. He has been described as one of Duke's greatest players of all time, ranking 6th in career points, 8th in career rebounds, and 7th in career assists–the only player in the top 10 of all three categories. Ferry became the first player in Atlantic Coast Conference (ACC) history to collect more than 2,000 points, 1,000 rebounds and 500 assists in his collegiate career. He left Duke with several national player of the year awards under his belt, including the Naismith College Player of the Year, USBWA College Player of the Year (Oscar Robertson Trophy) and the UPI player of the year awards.   Ferry's number 35 was retired in 1989 at the end of his senior season.  In 2002, Ferry was named to the ACC 50th Anniversary men's basketball team honoring the fifty greatest players in ACC history.

Professional career

Italy
After college, Ferry was drafted by the Los Angeles Clippers in the first round (second overall pick) of the 1989 NBA draft; he did not want to play with the Clippers and accepted an offer to play for the Italian league's Il Messaggero (now Virtus Roma) instead.  Ferry made a name for himself overseas as he averaged 23 points and six rebounds per game during the 1989–90 season, leading the Italian club into the playoffs. The Clippers traded Ferry's rights on November 16, 1989, along with Reggie Williams to the Cleveland Cavaliers in exchange for high-scoring guard Ron Harper, two first-round draft picks and a second-round pick.

Cleveland Cavaliers
In the summer of 1990, the Cavaliers signed Ferry to a 10-year guaranteed contract for $34 million. Ferry became the team's all-time leader in games played (723 games) before Žydrūnas Ilgauskas surpassed his record on December 2, 2009. He had a decent career in Cleveland, but he never became the type of star the Cavs had hoped for based on his outstanding play during college and in Italy. Ferry's best season in Cleveland came in 1995–96, when he averaged 13.3 points per game. He had only one other season in his career (1996–1997) in which he averaged more than 10 points per game. During Ferry's 10 years in Cleveland, the team made the NBA playoffs six times.

San Antonio Spurs
After Ferry left the Cleveland Cavaliers, he signed with the San Antonio Spurs as a free agent on August 10, 2000. As an off-the-bench shooter, Ferry played for San Antonio for three seasons and won an NBA championship with them in the 2002–03 season before retiring in 2003.

Management career
From 2003 to 2005, Ferry worked in the San Antonio Spurs' front office.

On June 27, 2005, the Cleveland Cavaliers signed Ferry to a five-year contract worth close to $10 million as their eighth general manager. Ferry began his management tenure with the Cavaliers overseeing a series of less-than-optimal transactions. Nonetheless, the team flourished with superstar LeBron James and newly installed head coach Mike Brown at the helm as the team made a series of serious postseason runs beginning in 2006. Ferry, Brown, and Cavaliers majority owner Dan Gilbert began to add talent and depth to the Cavs' roster, notably acquiring one-time All-Star guard Mo Williams, former All-Star center Shaquille O'Neal, starting shooting guard Anthony Parker, forward Leon Powe, and former All-Star Antawn Jamison between 2008 and 2010. The personnel shuffling paid off in the 2008–09 season, when Cleveland not only won its first Central Division title since 1976 but also—for the first time ever—finished with the best record in the NBA. In the 2009–10 season, Cleveland repeated these feats, attaining the NBA's best record for the second consecutive season. The Cavaliers also reached the NBA Finals for the first time in 2007.

On June 4, 2010, it was announced that Ferry and the Cavaliers had come to a mutual agreement to part ways. The Cavaliers went 272–138 during Ferry's tenure. In August 2010, Ferry returned to the Spurs as Vice President of Basketball Operations.

On June 25, 2012, Ferry accepted a position as President of Basketball Operations and General Manager for the Atlanta Hawks. In June 2014, Ferry read aloud verbatim an "offensive and racist comment" written in a scouting report during a conference call about Miami Heat player Luol Deng. Hawks co-owner Michael Gearon Jr. called for him to resign or be dismissed. On September 9, Hawks CEO Steve Koonin announced that the team had decided not to dismiss Ferry and that they were instead going to discipline him. A few days later, Ferry asked to take—and was approved for—an immediate, indefinite leave of absence. In June 2015, an independent investigation reported that Ferry's actions were not motivated by racism. According to UPI, "[the] investigation, which included 19 witness interviews and reviewed the contents of more than 24,000 emails, made clear that the offensive language was not Ferry's and none of Ferry's remarks or behavior during the call were motivated by racial or ethnic animus, or by a person's country of origin. To the contrary, the investigation found Ferry shared his own opinion of Deng, recommended him both personally and professionally and ultimately tried to sign him to the team." Following the release of the investigation results, Ferry reached a buyout agreement with the Hawks.

Ferry became a special advisor to the general manager of the New Orleans Pelicans in June 2016. After the firing of general manager Dell Demps on February 15, 2019, Ferry was named the team's interim general manager. He held the role for the rest of the season before being removed from his position on April 17 with the hiring of David Griffin as Executive Vice President of Basketball Operations. Ferry's position was then held by Trajan Langdon, effective on May 19.

See also
 List of NCAA Division I men's basketball players with 2000 points and 1000 rebounds

References

External links

NBA Draft Busts – No. 10 

1966 births
Living people
All-American college men's basketball players
American expatriate basketball people in Italy
American men's basketball players
Atlanta Hawks executives
Basketball players from Maryland
Cleveland Cavaliers executives
Cleveland Cavaliers players
DeMatha Catholic High School alumni
Duke Blue Devils men's basketball players
Los Angeles Clippers draft picks
McDonald's High School All-Americans
Medalists at the 1987 Summer Universiade
National Basketball Association general managers
New Orleans Pelicans executives
Pallacanestro Virtus Roma players
Parade High School All-Americans (boys' basketball)
People from Hyattsville, Maryland
Power forwards (basketball)
San Antonio Spurs executives
San Antonio Spurs players
Small forwards
Sportspeople from Shaker Heights, Ohio
Universiade medalists in basketball
Universiade silver medalists for the United States